Jazzonia is a cover album by American composer Bill Laswell, released on August 25, 1998 by Douglas Music.

Track listing

Personnel 
Adapted from the Jazzonia liner notes.
Musicians
Asante – vocals (1, 3, 4, 6, 7, 8)
Karl Berger – vibraphone (1, 2, 3, 7), piano (3, 5), synthesizer and keyboard bass (5, 7), musical arrangements (1, 2, 5, 7)
Dana Bryant – vocals (1, 4)
Bootsy Collins – vocals (6)
Grand Mixer DXT – turntables (5, 6)
Graham Haynes – cornet (4, 6), flugelhorn (7)
Byard Lancaster – alto saxophone (1, 4), tenor saxophone (2, 8, 9), flute (8, 9)
Bill Laswell – bass guitar (1, 2, 3, 4, 6, 8, 9), percussion (1, 2, 3, 4, 8, 9), turntables (1, 2, 8, 9), effects (5), drum programming (5)
Melle Mel – vocals (4, 8)
Amina Claudine Myers – Hammond organ and electric piano (4, 6, 8, 9), voice (7)
Roc Raida – turntables (3, 4)
Alicia Renee – vocals (1, 3, 8)
Brandon Ross – guitar (1, 2, 8, 9)
Nicky Skopelitis – guitar (7)
Technical personnel
Alan Douglas – producer
Joe Gastwirt – mastering
Robert Musso – engineering

Release history

References

External links 
 

1998 albums
Bill Laswell albums
Albums produced by Alan Douglas (record producer)
Albums produced by Bill Laswell
Covers albums